Khaudum National Park is an isolated Nature Reserve situated in the Kalahari Desert at the west of the Caprivi Strip in northeast of Namibia. It is a very remote and inaccessible reserve but is home to some magnificent animals, such as the lion and hyena. The park also has a campsite for visitors.

Geography 
The Khaudum National Park is located in Kalahari Desert. The three largest dry rivers (known as Omuramba)—Nhoma, Cwiba, and Khaudum—run through the wildlife park. They play an important ecological role when they run during the rainy season.

Climate 
The Kavango East Region has a long, dry season from April to November and a subsequent wet period from December to March. The climate is in the BSh category, on the Köppen climate classification scale.

In the dry season in winter, the humidity is at 30% and the daily maximum daytime temperatures are above . Even at night the temperature does not fall below .

Vegetation 
The dominant vegetation in the park is species-rich, high and short dry forest and dry acacia forest. Trees can reach a height of up to 10 m and have a relatively dense undergrowth. The species range includes Pterocarpus angolensis, Baikiaea plurijuga, Burkea africana and Guibourtia coleosperma. In contrast to the dry high forest the trees in the lower forest reach less than 5 meters height. Species include Lonchocarpus neisii and Terminalia sericea, interspersed with Faidherbia albida and Grewia. Along the Omuramba is denser acacia dry forest, often with very large population of thorn bushes including Acacia erioloba, Acacia fleckii, Acacia hebeclada, and Acacia tortilis together with occasional Combretum imberbe and Combretum hereroense. The bed of the Omuramba is peaty-boggy and consists of dense Reed including Phragmites and more infrequently, water lilies. Terminalia prunioides (blood fruit trees) also dominate.

Fauna 
The unspoiled nature of the reserve encourages a rich and varied wildlife in the dry forest. The ideal time for seeing wildlife is from June to October. From November to March, more than 320 species of birds inhabit the area, including parrots and more than 50 birds of prey.

Big game can be found in the park occasionally, more than 500 African bush elephants, many Angolan giraffes and many antelope, including roan antelope, kudu, lyre antelope, eland and reedbuck. Even the stock of prey animals is high. Besides the smaller cats, there is a larger population of lions, but also leopards, spotted hyenas, jackals, occasionally cheetahs and even African wild dogs.

Since 2005, the protected area is considered a Lion Conservation Unit together with Caprivi Game Park.

Tourism 
Khaudum, though very isolated, does see a large number of tourists every year. Initially, only two camps were open to visitors, but both camps and the whole Park were closed in May 2013. In 2015, the Khaudum campsite was privatized and completely renovated. It now offers 6 shaded camping areas near the Xaudum Lodge.

External links 
Ministry of Environment and Tourism: Khaudum National Park

References 

National parks of Namibia